Elvira García y García (1862-1951) was a Peruvian educator and feminist. She founded the pioneer girls' school Liceo Peruano (1883) the leading feminist publication Liceo Fanning (1894-1914), and is regarded as a pioneer in women's education in Peru. She was the daughter of Aurelio Garcia y Garcia, Rear-Admiral of the Peruvian Navy who was considered one of the "four aces" of Peru's incipient navy (along with Miguel Grau and Lizardo Montero Flores).

References

 Basadre, Jorge: History of the Republic of Peru. 1822 - 1933, Eighth Edition, corrected and augmented. Volume 9, p. 2166; volume 14, p. 3389. Edited by the "La República" newspaper of Lima and the "Ricardo Palma" University. Printed in Santiago, Chile, 1998

1862 births
1951 deaths
19th-century Peruvian people
Peruvian feminists
Peruvian women activists
Heads of schools in Peru
19th-century Peruvian women
Peruvian suffragists